Ultrastructural Pathology is a bimonthly peer-reviewed medical journal devoted entirely to diagnostic ultrastructural pathology. The journal covers advances in the uses of electron microscopic and immunohistochemical techniques, correlations of ultrastructural data with light microscopy, histochemistry, immunohistochemistry, biochemistry, cell and tissue culturing, electron probe analysis, and investigative, clinical, and diagnostic EM methods. The editor-in-chief is Jahn M. Nesland (Institute for Cancer Research, Norwegian Radium Hospital, Oslo, Norway).

According to the Journal Citation Reports, the journal has a 2016 impact factor of 0.694.

References

External links 
 

Pathology journals
Publications established in 1980
Bimonthly journals
Taylor & Francis academic journals
English-language journals